James Duckworth and Pierre-Hugues Herbert won the first edition of the tournament 7–5, 6–2 in the final against Guilherme Clezar and Fabrício Neis.

Seeds

Draw

Draw

References
 Main Draw

Taroii Open de Tenis - Doubles
2013 Doubles